Harry Fritz (born 19 February 1951) is a Canadian-American former professional tennis player.

Biography
A left-handed player, Fritz was born in Yuma, Arizona and played collegiate tennis for East Texas State. He was a member of the university's 1972 NAIA championship team, in a year he also won the singles and doubles individual titles.

Fritz's best performance on the professional tour was a runner-up finish at the Lagos Open in 1980. He also featured in the main draw of the 1980 US Open and as a doubles player made further appearances at the Australian Open and Wimbledon.

While based in Toronto he qualified to represent Canada and was for a period the top ranked Canadian player. In 1982 he appeared in three Davis Cup ties for his adoptive country. This included the longest ever singles rubber in Davis Cup history, which he won over Jorge Andrew of Venezuela 16–14, 11–9, 9–11, 4–6, 11–9, for a total of 100 games.

His brother Guy Fritz was also a professional tennis player and is the father of Harry's nephew Taylor Fritz.

Grand Prix career finals

Singles: 1 (0–1)

See also
List of Canada Davis Cup team representatives

References

External links
 
 
 

1951 births
Living people
Canadian male tennis players
American male tennis players
Texas A&M University–Commerce alumni
American emigrants to Canada
People from Yuma, Arizona
Tennis people from Arizona